Garra nigricollis is a species of ray-finned fish in the genus Garra.

References 

Garra
Fish described in 2004